Miguel Maysonet (born December 13, 1989) is a former American football running back. He was signed by the Philadelphia Eagles as an undrafted free agent in 2013. He played college football at Stony Brook.

Early years
He attended Riverhead High School. He was named 2009 New York State Gatorade Player of the Year. He won the 2008 Hansen Award in which names the top football player in Suffolk County.

During a game against winless Smithtown East, he did fumble once caused by NT Alex Coymen

Professional career

2013 NFL Combine

Philadelphia Eagles
On April 27, 2013, Maysonet signed with the Philadelphia Eagles as an undrafted free agent. On May 20, 2013, he was released.

Cleveland Browns
On May 21, 2013, Maysonet was claimed off waivers by the Cleveland Browns. He was later released by the Browns on August 31, 2013.

Indianapolis Colts
On September 16, 2013, Maysonet was signed to the Indianapolis Colts' practice squad, but was released on September 26, 2013.

San Diego Chargers
On October 1, 2013, Maysonet was signed by the San Diego Chargers to their practice squad. He was released on October 9, 2013.

New York Jets
Maysonet was signed to the New York Jets' practice squad on October 15, 2013. He was released on October 22, 2013.

Washington Redskins
On December 10, Maysonet signed with the Washington Redskins practice squad.

Pittsburgh Steelers
On January 7, 2014, he signed with the Pittsburgh Steelers to reserve/future contract. The Steelers released Maysonet on August 26, 2014.

Buffalo Bills
On October 16, 2015, Maysonet was signed by the Buffalo Bills to their practice squad. On November 3, 2015, he was released.

References

External links
Hofstra Pride bio
Stony Brook Seawolves bio

1989 births
Living people
Philadelphia Eagles players
Cleveland Browns players
Indianapolis Colts players
San Diego Chargers players
New York Jets players
Washington Redskins players
Pittsburgh Steelers players
Buffalo Bills players
Hofstra Pride football players
Stony Brook Seawolves football players